Oded David "Dedi" Graucher, known professionally as Dedi, is an Israeli Orthodox Jewish singer.

Music career
Dedi began his music career performing back-up vocals for a couple of Mordechai Ben David albums in the late 1970s and early 1980s. In 1995 he shared the stage with Ben David at two Sukkot concerts in Israel, one in Haifa that drew 3,000 participants and one at Yad Eliyahu Stadium in Tel Aviv that attracted 10,000 people.

He performed the songs "Hebron" and "Lo Nazuz Mikan" ("We Will Not Move From Here") on the album Hebron's Song of Songs.

Dedi collaborated with composers Yossi Green, Rabbi Boruch Chait, Abie Rotenberg, and others for the songs featured on his albums. The music on his albums were arranged by Moshe Laufer, Mona (Moshe) Rosenblum, Suki Berry, Yisroel Lamm (the Neginah Orchestra), and Ruvi Banet.
He has been featured at several HASC "A Time for Music" concerts, including HASC 6 (1993), HASC 15 (2002), HASC 20 (2007), HASC 23 (2010), and HASC 25 (2012).
In 2004 Dedi appeared in concert with Yerachmiel Begun and the Miami Boys Choir for their 26th year celebration, entitled "Miami and Dedi". The concert was released on CD and DVD. He also appeared on a number of all-star cast albums produced by Suki & Ding, as well as Gideon Levine.

Family
Dedi and his wife Malca live in Petah Tikva. Their son, Aviel Graucher, is a music arranger and composer.

Discography

Solo albums
V'sechezena (1985)
Rotzoh (1993)
Omnom (1994)
V'ohavto (1996)
Bit'chu Bashem (1997)
Adon Hashalom (1999)
Hooked on Dedi (2001)
Hakol Letova (2003)
Mipnei Ma (Single) (2008)
Baou Nesameach (Single) (2017)
Vechozakto (Single) (2017)

Collaborations
Mordechai Ben David – V'chol Ma'aminim (Background Vocals) (1978)
Mordechai Ben David – Memories (Backup Choir) (1981)
C. Rosenfeld - Stars of Chasidic Music in Songs — Zechor Hashem & Galeh Kvod (Solo)
Hassidic Hit Parade 5742 — Esa Einai (Solo) (1983)
Aryeh Glazer – Benei Beyscha (Background Vocals)
Laibale Haschel – Mital Hashamayim Umishmanei Ha'aretz (Vocals) (1987)
Kol Salonika – Vesamachta (Soloist) (1989)
HASC – A Time for Music: Volumes 6, 10, 11, 12, 13, 15, 20, 23, 25 & 28
Haneshama Lach Vol. 3 (2003) (with Shalhevet Orchestra)
Miami & Dedi: Kol Yisrael Areivim Zeh Lazeh (2004) (with Miami Boys Choir)
Ringling Bros. and Barnum & Bailey – Chol Hamoed Pesach (2005) (with Avraham Fried)
Dedi & Yonatan (2005)
The Event (2009) (with Lipa Schmeltzer, Mordechai Ben David, and others)

References

External links
“Rare Dedi Footage 94 Free MP3 Download”

Israeli Orthodox Jews
Hasidic singers
Living people
Year of birth missing (living people)
Orthodox pop musicians